Birol Topaloğlu (b.1965, Pazar, Rize) is a Turkish folk musician and activist of Laz ancestry.

Discography 

Heyamo (1997)
Aravani (2000)
Ezmoce (2007)
Destani (2007)
Kıyı Boyu Karadeniz (2011)

Bibliography 

 Eliot Bates: Social Interactions, Musical Arrangement, and the Production of Digital Audio in Istanbul Recording Studios. Dissertation. University of California at Berkeley 2008, S. 78f (bei google books)

References 

People from Pazar, Rize
Turkish singer-songwriters
Turkish people of Laz descent
Laz people
20th-century Turkish male singers
21st-century Turkish male singers
1965 births
Living people